Kim Bok-sun (Hangul: 김복선, Hanja: 金福仙) is a retired female badminton player from South Korea.  She specialized in women's singles.  She reached the women's singles quarter-finals of the IBF World Championships in 1983 and 1985.  She is the mother of doubles player Chae Yoo-jung.

References

South Korean female badminton players
Living people
Year of birth missing (living people)